Nupen is a surname. Notable people with the surname include:

 Buster Nupen (1902–1977), South African cricketer 
 Christopher Nupen (1934–2023), South African-born, UK-based filmmaker
 Kjell Nupen (1955–2014), Norwegian contemporary artist